The Carnegie Library School of Atlanta (1905 - 1988) was a training school for librarians in Atlanta, Georgia. Emory University has a collection of the school's files. Originally known as Southern Library School, it opened September 20, 1905 with Anne Wallace as its director. It affiliated with Emory University in 1925 and remained the only nationally accredited library school until 1930. It closed in 1988.

In 1921, the Director of the Carnegie Library School, Tommie Dora Barker, opened the Auburn Avenue Branch Library, the first branch library for blacks in Atlanta. A Carnegie Library, it was located in the Sweet Auburn neighborhood. The Auburn Avenue Research Library on African American Culture and History succeeded it.

References

Educational institutions established in 1905
Universities and colleges in Atlanta
Defunct universities and colleges in Georgia (U.S. state)
1905 establishments in Georgia (U.S. state)